"Because You Love Me" is a song written by Kostas and John Scott Sherrill, and recorded by American country music singer Jo Dee Messina.  It was released in October 1999 as the fifth and final single from her album I'm Alright.  The song peaked at number 8 on the Hot Country Singles & Tracks (now Hot Country Songs) chart and peaked at number 11 on the Canadian RPM Country Singles.  It also peaked at number 53 on the U.S. Billboard Hot 100 making it a minor crossover hit.

Critical reception
Deborah Evans Price, of Billboard magazine, reviewed the song favorably, saying that the song reminds everybody that she is "equally capable of wringing every drop of tender emotion from a power ballad." She calls the lyric a "well-written treatise on the impact love can have on a life, and Messina wraps her voice around the sentiment and carries it like a beloved flag."

Music video
The music video was directed by Lawrence Carroll and premiered in October 1999.

Chart performance
"Because You Love Me" debuted at number 51 on the U.S. Billboard Hot Country Singles & Tracks for the week of October 23, 1999.

Year-end charts

References

1999 singles
1998 songs
Jo Dee Messina songs
Songs written by Kostas (songwriter)
Songs written by John Scott Sherrill
Song recordings produced by Byron Gallimore
Song recordings produced by Tim McGraw
Curb Records singles